Pedro Luís Machado Ganchas (born 31 May 2000) is a Portuguese professional footballer who plays as a defender for Primeira Liga club F.C. Paços de Ferreira.

Career statistics

Club

Notes

References

2000 births
Living people
Portuguese footballers
Portugal youth international footballers
Association football defenders
Liga Portugal 2 players
Primeira Liga players
S.L. Benfica B players
F.C. Paços de Ferreira players
Footballers from Lisbon